William Meredith Cunningham (1901-1967) was an acclaimed Oklahoma writer of the 1930s, involved in the Works Progress Administration's Federal Writer's Project, and was a supporter of the American Socialist Party.

Biography 
Bill Cunningham was born on May 13, 1901, in Okeene, Oklahoma and was the brother of Agnes "Sis" Cunningham. He graduated from the University of Oklahoma in 1925 with a degree in Journalism and worked as the editor of the Watonga Herald and a high school teacher. Cunningham also taught at Commonwealth College (a leftist and pro-labor school) in Mena, Arkansas in the 1930s.

In 1935, Cunningham published his two books: The Green Corn Rebellion, a fictionalized account of Oklahoma farmers protesting the United States' involvement in World War I; and Pretty Boy, a novel recounting the legend of Charles "Pretty Boy" Floyd. Notably, Cunningham was involved in the Works Progress Administration (WPA), serving as the state director of Oklahoma's Federal Writer's Project from 1935 to 1938, when he moved to Washington D.C. to serve as the assistant to the national director of the Federal Writer's Project. While working for the WPA, Cunningham contributed to the W.P.A Guide to Oklahoma, Born in Slavery: Slave Narratives from the Federal Writers' Project 1936-1938, and a Comanche dictionary. Cunningham then moved to New York, where he worked in journalism and published two more books, including one co-authored with his wife, Sara Brown Cunningham.

Published works 
The Green Corn Rebellion. New York: Vanguard Press, 1935 
Pretty Boy. New York: Vanguard, 1936 
The Real Book about Daniel Boone. Garden City, N.Y.: Garden City Books, by arrangement with F. Watts, 1952 Danny. With Sara Brown Cunningham. New York: Crown, 1953

References 

American writers
1901 births
1967 deaths